Archibald James Carey Jr. (February 29, 1908 – April 20, 1981) was an American lawyer, judge, politician, diplomat, and clergyman from the South Side of Chicago. He was elected as a city alderman and served for eight years under the patronage of the politician William L. Dawson. He served for several years as a pastor in the African Methodist Episcopal (AME) Church, when he became known as a civil rights activist. In 1957, he was appointed by President Dwight Eisenhower as chair of his committee on government employment policy, which worked to reduce racial discrimination.

Appointed to the Circuit Court of Cook County, Illinois, in 1966, Judge Carey became a major figure in Chicago's political life, serving until 1979. He won numerous awards for his oratorical skills and contributions to civic improvement.

Early life and education
Archibald Carey Jr. was born on February 29, 1908, in Chicago, Illinois. The youngest of five children born to the Reverend Archibald J. Carey, a minister of the African Methodist Episcopal Church, and his wife, Elizabeth H. (Davis) Carey, Carey Jr. was a native of Chicago. He attended Wendell Phillips High School. He received a Bachelor of Science degree from Lewis Institute (now Illinois Institute of Technology) in 1928, as well as a  degree from Northwestern University in 1932, and a Bachelor of Laws degree from Chicago-Kent College of Law in Chicago in 1935.

Career
After being accepted to the bar, Carey set up a practice in Chicago. He became politically active and allied with William L. Dawson, a leading African-American politician on the city's South Side. Carey was twice elected to serve as an alderman from Chicago's Third Ward, serving from 1947 to 1955. During this time, he was chosen to give a speech to the 1952 Republican National Convention, which met that year in Chicago, and called for equal rights for all minorities.

The following year, Carey was appointed as an alternate delegate from the United States to the United Nations, serving from 1953 to 1956. From 1955 to 1961, he served on the President's Committee on Government Employment Policy; on August 3, 1957, he was appointed by President Dwight D. Eisenhower as Chair of the committee, succeeding Maxwell Abbell, who died. Carey was the first African American to hold this position. Already a confidante of Martin Luther King Jr. and active in the national civil rights movement, Carey worked to end employment discrimination in the government against blacks.

Carey was appointed as a county Circuit Court judge in Chicago in 1966, by which time he had switched parties to Democrat. He served until 1978, when he was forced by law to retire from the bench at 70 years of age. Because of the court's large caseload, he was reappointed to serve another year.

AME Church
In 1949, Carey was named as pastor of his father's church, Quinn Chapel AME Church in Chicago. He served through 1967, when he was named pastor emeritus.

In 1960 Carey addressed the World Methodist Council held in Oslo, Norway that year, discussing how AME activists in the United States drew from Wesleyan theology and praxis in their approach. He noted that they were inspired by the work of Richard Allen, the founder and first bishop of the AME Church. He was among numerous AME clergy and members who were active in the civil rights movement, but the institution as a whole at the time did not strongly embrace activism.

Family
Archibald J. Carey Jr. was married to Hazel Harper. They had a daughter, Carolyn Eloise.
Grandchildren:
Renee, Jennifer, Nicole, William, Archibald James, Christopher.

He died on April 20, 1981, in Chicago.

"Let Freedom Ring"

Carey gave a speech at the 1952 Republican National Convention, titled "Let Freedom Ring".

The historian Drew D. Hansen notes that Martin Luther King Jr. plagiarized from this speech in creating his own celebrated "I Have a Dream" speech, noting that many of the motifs and tropes were part of a common language.

See also
 List of Chicago aldermen since 1923

References

Further reading
 William J. Grimshaw (1992), Bitter Fruit: Black Politics and the Chicago Machine, 1931–1991,  University of Chicago Press,

External links
 The story of his life is retold in the radio drama "Anatomy of an Ordinance", a presentation from Destination Freedom

1908 births
1981 deaths
African-American people in Illinois politics
African Methodist Episcopal Church clergy
Activists for African-American civil rights
Chicago City Council members
Illinois Republicans
John Marshall Law School (Chicago) alumni
20th-century American politicians
Judges of the Circuit Court of Cook County (pre-1964 reorganization)